Cynoglossus acaudatus, commonly known as the Natal tongue fish is a species of tonguefish. It is commonly found in shallow muddy or sandy waters along the coast of the Western Indian Ocean, Somalia down to South Africa, including Seychelles.

References

Fishbase

Cynoglossidae
Fish described in 1906